In epidemiology, the relative risk reduction (RRR) or efficacy is the relative decrease in the risk of an adverse event in the exposed group compared to an unexposed group. If the direction of risk change is not assumed, the term relative effect is used, and it is computed in the same way as relative risk increase.

Numerical examples

Risk reduction

Risk increase

See also 

 Population Impact Measures
 Vaccine efficacy

References

Epidemiology
Medical statistics
Statistical ratios